The Euctenizidae (formerly Cyrtaucheniidae subfamily Euctenizinae) are a family of mygalomorph spiders. They are now considered to be more closely related to Idiopidae.

Etymology
The name comes from the Greek prefix  (eu-), meaning "valuable" or "good", which had been thought that the family Ctenizidae possess these traits.

Biology
Many, but not all, make wafer-like doors to their burrows, while others build the cork-like doors found commonly in the true trapdoor spiders. The biology of nearly all of the species is poorly known.

Distribution
The family occurs almost exclusively in the United States and Mexico.  Common U.S. genera include Myrmekiaphila, Aptostichus and Promyrmekiaphila.

Genera

, the World Spider Catalog accepts the following genera:

Apomastus Bond & Opell, 2002 — United States
Aptostichus Simon, 1891 — United States, Mexico
Entychides Simon, 1888 — United States, Mexico
Eucteniza Ausserer, 1875 — Mexico, United States
Myrmekiaphila Atkinson, 1886 — United States
Neoapachella Bond & Opell, 2002 — United States
Promyrmekiaphila Schenkel, 1950 — United States

See also
 List of Euctenizidae species
 Spider families

Footnotes

References
 {Raven, Robert J. (1985): The spider Infraorder Mygalomorphae (Araneae): cladistics and systematics. Bulletin of the American Museum of Natural History 182: 1–180.
 Murphy, Frances & Murphy, John (2000): An Introduction to the Spiders of South East Asia. Malaysian Nature Society, Kuala Lumpur.
 Bond, J. E. Phylogenetic treatment and taxonomic revision of the trapdoor spider genus Aptostichus Simon (Araneae, Mygalomorphae, Euctenizidae). ZooKeys 252: 1–209.
 Bond, J. E., C. A. Hamilton, N. L. Garrison & C. H. Ray. Phylogenetic reconsideration of Myrmekiaphila systematics with a description of the trapdoor spider species Myrmekiaphila tigris (Araneae, Mygalomorphae, Cyrtaucheniidae, Euctenizinae) from Auburn, Alabama. ZooKeys 190: 94–109.
 Bond, J. E., B. E. Hendrixson, C. A. Hamilton & M. Hedin. A reconsideration of the classification of the spider infraorder Mygalomorphae (Arachnida: Araneae) based on three nuclear genes and morphology. PLoS One 7(6): e38753.
 Platnick, Norman I. (2014): The world spider catalog, version 14.5. American Museum of Natural History.

External links

 
Mygalomorphae families